The Colored Catholic Congress movement was a series of meetings organized by Daniel Rudd in the late 19th and early 20th centuries for African-American Catholics to discuss issues affecting their communities, churches, and other institutions. 

Part of the Colored Conventions Movement, the congresses ran from 1889 to 1894, before folding for unknown reasons.

Revival 

The movement was revived in the late 20th century as the National Black Catholic Congress, under the leadership of several national Black Catholic organizations and the first NBCC president, Bishop John Ricard, SSJ.

Notable participants 

 Daniel Rudd
 Fr Augustus Tolton
 Fr Charles Uncles, SSJ
 Fredrick McGhee
 William Edgar Easton
 Fr John R. Slattery, SSJ

References 
African-American Roman Catholicism

African-American organizations
Catholicism in the United States
Catholic organizations established in the 19th century